The Hermitage is a historic house in the Sydney suburb of Vaucluse, New South Wales, Australia. It is listed on the (now defunct) Australian Register of the National Estate as well as the Municipality of Woollahra local government heritage list.

History and description
The main house was designed and built around 1870-1878 in the Victorian Rustic Gothic style by Edward Mason Hunt, influenced by the design of Roslyndale, in Woollahra, New South Wales. It features a castellated tower, elaborately carved barge boards and a roof of multiple gables. The house was seriously damaged by a fire in 1936, and was restored by Emil Sodersten. It was bought by the Woolworths company in 1964 and used as a staff training centre, but later returned to its original role as a private home. This Gothic house overlooks Hermitage Reserve and has harbour views. The Hermitage incorporates a smaller house, which was built  by Alexander Dick.

The Hermitage is owned by the family of Justin Hemmes.

References

External links 
 
 
 

Houses completed in 1878
1878 establishments in Australia
Houses in Sydney
Victorian architecture in Sydney
Vaucluse, New South Wales
Sandstone houses in Australia
New South Wales places listed on the defunct Register of the National Estate
New South Wales Heritage Database